Guttahalli is a small village in the Chintamani Taluk of Chikkaballapura district in Karnataka, India. It is situated about 9 kilometers from Chintamani.

Demographics 
According to the 2011 Indian Census, the village consists of 454 people. The town has a literacy rate of 59.25 percent which is lower than Karnataka's average of 75.36 percent.

References

Villages in Chikkaballapur district